The following lists events that happened during 1918 in the Principality of Albania.

Incumbents
President: Turhan Përmeti, Chairman of the Provisional Government (starting 28 December)

Events
November
World War I: The war ended with Albanian territory divided under Italian, Serbian, Greek and French military occupation.
December
Albanian leaders met at Durrës to discuss presentation of Albanian interests at the upcoming Paris Peace Conference.

Births
 22 April - Ibrahim Kodra, Albanian painter

Deaths
 11 February - Murat Toptani, Albanian poet, artist and activist of the Albanian National Awakening

References

 
1910s in Albania
Years of the 20th century in Albania